Soledad Gallego-Díaz (born 1951) is a Spanish journalist, and was the editor of Spanish newspaper El País from June 2018 to June 2020.

Biography 
Born in Madrid in 1951, she lived for a year in Palo Alto and another year in Nashville when she was a toddler. She took studies at the Official School of Journalism of Madrid. She worked for Pyresa and Cuadernos para el Diálogo before joining El País shortly after the foundation of the newspaper in 1976.

She has been correspondent in Brussels, Paris, London, Buenos Aires and New York.

She won the Cirilo Rodríguez Journalism Award in 2010.

Her appointment as the first-ever female editor of El País was announced in June 2018. She succeeded Antonio Caño, who had been the editor since 2014.

Before becoming the editor of El País she also collaborated in Hoy por hoy and was a member of the editorial board of ctxt.es.

References

Living people
El País editors
Spanish journalists
1951 births